Julier, meaning "Julia's", may refer to one of the following

Places in Switzerland:
Julier Pass 
Piz Julier